Sayur sop is an Indonesian vegetable soup prepared from vegetables in chicken or beef broth. It is popular in Indonesia, served as breakfast or lunch.

Ingredients
Sayur sop is made up of carrot, cabbage, cauliflower, potato, tomato, broccoli, leek, mushroom, snap bean, macaroni and bakso or sausage, spiced with black pepper, garlic and shallot in chicken or beef broth. Fried shallots and celery can be added to sayur sop.

Sayur sop is comfort food commonly served with steamed rice, tempeh and corn fritter.

See also

Cuisine of Indonesia
List of soups
List of Indonesian soups
Sayur asem
Sayur bayam
Sayur lodeh
Sayur oyong
Sup ercis
Sup wortel

References

Indonesian soups
Vegetarian dishes of Indonesia
Vegetable dishes of Indonesia